Sir Ernest William Morris  (1866 – 25 May 1937) was an English chemist who served as secretary and house governor of The London Hospital (1903–1930).

He was born in Madras, India, the son of  Rev. William Edward Morris of Market Harborough and his wife, Mary.

Selected publications
A History of the London Hospital. Edward Arnold, London, 1910.

References 

1866 births
1937 deaths
Knights Bachelor
Commanders of the Order of the British Empire